John Henry Clavell Smythe MBE (1915–1996) was a Royal Air Force officer during World War II and a figure in Sierra Leone. He was born a Sierra Leone Creole into the British Empire and served as a navigation officer in the Royal Air Force. He was shot down over Nazi Germany and spent two years as a prisoner of war. After liberation and return to Britain, he was a huge role model to those in the beginning of the Windrush Generation. He retrained as a lawyer, returned to his birthplace, and served as Attorney General of Sierra Leone.

Early life and family background
Johnny Smythe was born in 1915 in Freetown, Sierra Leone to a Creole family, a grandson of John H. Smythe, American ambassador to Liberia. Johnny Smythe attended the Sierra Leone Grammar School and subsequently worked as a clerk for the city council.

Military service
Smythe was one of the few West Africans to serve in the Royal Air Force during the Second World War. On 14 May 1943, he received an emergency commission as a pilot officer in the RAFVR, and was promoted war-substantive flying officer six months later.  After 26 successful bombing missions which earned him a reputation for being lucky, as the No. 623 Squadron RAF Short Stirling aircraft he flew in were hit several times but always managed to return, he was shot down and spent 18 months as a prisoner of war in Stalag Luft I camp.

On 14 May 1945, a week after the war ended, Smythe was promoted war-substantive flight lieutenant in the RAFVR, receiving a regular commission as a flight lieutenant in the RAF on 9 May 1947 (seniority from 14 November 1947).

After the war, Smythe joined the Colonial Office, with responsibility for the welfare of demobilised RAF personnel from Africa and the Caribbean. In 1948 he became the senior Colonial Office official on the Empire Windrush, a captured German troop ship taking former military personnel back to their homes in the Caribbean. On discovering that it would be very hard for the men to find jobs in Jamaica, Smythe consulted the Colonial Office, which agreed that the men should return to Britain. West Indians who settled in Britain from that point became known as the Windrush generation. For his services, Smythe was appointed a Member of the Order of the British Empire, Military Division (MBE) in the 1951 Birthday Honours. He ended his active service in the RAF in June 1951, transferring to the reserves.

Later career
After Smythe twice successfully defended men facing courts martial, despite having no legal training, a judge suggested that he take up a career in law and provided a letter of introduction. He qualified as a barrister and returned to Freetown, Sierra Leone's capital, where he was appointed a Queen's Counsel and eventually became Attorney General.

On an official visit to the United States, Smythe was invited to the White House by President John F. Kennedy. Both Smythe and Kennedy had back pain because of injuries sustained during the Second World War, and Kennedy recommended that Smythe consult his own chiropractor.

At a social occasion in Freetown, Smythe was talking to the German Ambassador. In the course of conversation, the ambassador revealed that he had been a fighter pilot who shot down his first British bomber on the date and in the place where Smythe had been shot down.

Legacy
Smythe achievements and contributions have been widely recognized in different world war records.  In 2022, there was a docudrama made in honor of him in a film entitled Flying For Britain in partnership with  the Royal Air Force Museum and National Heritage Fund. Actor Ricardo P Lloyd portrays  him in the film.

References

https://www.blackpast.org/global-african-history/smythe-john-henry-1915-1996/
https://www.iwm.org.uk/collections/item/object/80033149
https://www.museumoflondon.org.uk/discover/sierra-leone-stalag-luft-i-remembering-johnny-smythe

1915 births
1996 deaths
20th-century Sierra Leonean lawyers
People of Sierra Leone Creole descent
Royal Air Force officers
Royal Air Force Volunteer Reserve personnel of World War II
Members of the Order of the British Empire
20th-century King's Counsel
Attorneys-general of Sierra Leone
People from Freetown
British World War II prisoners of war
Shot-down aviators
World War II prisoners of war held by Germany
Sierra Leonean military personnel